Ordos railway station is a railway station of the Baotou–Xi'an railway, and is the terminus of the Hohhot–Jungar–Ordos railway. It opened in May 2016.

The station is located around 8 km from the urban core of the city, and 10 km from Ordos Ejin Horo Airport. As of 2020, the station currently receives 15 daily services.

In 2021, the first Fuxing service to Xi'an was introduced, shortening the journey time between the two cities.

References

Railway stations in China opened in 2016
Railway stations in Inner Mongolia